Chobankara, is a former village in the Armavir Province of Armenia.

References 

Former populated places in Armavir Province